Cade Doughty (born March 26, 2001) is an American college baseball second baseman in the Toronto Blue Jays organization. He is ranked 11th on Major League Baseball's 2022 Top 30 Blue Jays prospects list.

Amateur career
Doughty grew up in Denham Springs, Louisiana and attended Denham Springs High School. He was named the Louisiana Gatorade Player of the Year as a senior after hitting for a .505 average with 48 hits, six home runs, 10 doubles, four triples, 27 RBIs, 38 runs scored and 15 stolen bases. Doughty as selected in the 39th round of the 2019 MLB Draft by the Detroit Tigers, but did not sign with the team. He played summer collegiate baseball after graduating high school for the Gaithersburg Giants of the Cal Ripken Collegiate Baseball League and was named a league All-Star.

Doughty batted .278 with two home runs, a double, 12 RBIs and four stolen bases through 15 games during his true freshman season before it was cut short due to the coronavirus pandemic. In the following summer he played for the Boca Raton Blazers of the South Florida Collegiate Baseball League, where he hit for a .429 average. As a redshirt freshman, Doughty batted .308. with 11 doubles, two triples, 13 home runs, and 55 RBIs. He played for the Winter Park Diamond Dawgs in the Florida Collegiate Summer League during the summer of 2021. Doughty was named to the watchlist for the Golden Spikes Award and a preseason All-American by Baseball America entering his redshirt sophomore season. He was named the Southeastern Conference (SEC) Player of the Week after going 8-for-14 at the plate with three doubles, two home runs, seven runs scored and 12 RBIs in the Tigers' opening series against Maine.

Professional career
The Toronto Blue Jays selected Doughty 78th overall in the 2022 Major League Baseball draft. He signed with the team on July 23, and received an $833,600 signing bonus. Doughty was assigned to the Dunedin Blue Jays of the Single-A Florida State League to begin his professional career. 

Doughty played in a total of 26 games during the 2022 MiLB season batting .272 with 6 home runs, 5 doubles,  24 RBIs, and 3 stolen bases.

References

External links

LSU Tigers bio

Living people
Baseball second basemen
LSU Tigers baseball players
Baseball players from Louisiana
2001 births
Dunedin Blue Jays players